Trenton High School, also known as Trenton Junior College and Adams Middle School, is a historic school building located at Trenton, Grundy County, Missouri.  It was built in 1924, and is a three-story, rectangular, Classical Revival style reinforced concrete building with brick walls. It has a concrete foundation and flat roof with shaped parapets with cast stone coping.  It features decorative cast stone trim.  The school closed in 2005.

It was listed on the National Register of Historic Places in 2010.

References

High schools in Missouri
School buildings on the National Register of Historic Places in Missouri
Neoclassical architecture in Missouri
School buildings completed in 1924
Buildings and structures in Grundy County, Missouri
National Register of Historic Places in Grundy County, Missouri
1924 establishments in Missouri